The 1956 NC State Wolfpack football team represented North Carolina State University during the 1956 NCAA University Division football season. The Wolfpack were led by third-year head coach Earle Edwards and played their home games at Riddick Stadium in Raleigh, North Carolina. They competed as members of the Atlantic Coast Conference, finishing in sixth. NC State's victory over rival North Carolina was the school's first ACC victory, coming in their fourth year in the conference.

Schedule

References

NC State
NC State Wolfpack football seasons
NC State Wolfpack football